VidantaWorld (formerly known as Cirque du Soleil Theme Park Resort) is an announced theme park coming to Nuevo Vallarta, Mexico.

Development

On November 12, 2014, Cirque du Soleil, Grupo Vidanta and Legacy Entertainment announced a plan for a theme park in Nuevo Vallarta, Mexico. This includes at least two lands, the Village of the Sun and the Village of the Moon, and an outdoor evening show accommodating 3,000 to 5,000 spectators. It has water park and nature park elements. Construction began in September 2015. On November 30, 2015, Goddard Group released concept drawings for a previously unannounced water park.

In April 2021, the operator announced the plan of a fantasy-themed park, a water park, and a nature park, all connected to the Vidanta Nuevo Vallarta resort hotel and the beach by an aerial lift.

Launch was anticipated for 2018, but has been delayed until 2023.

References

External links 
 

Cirque du Soleil
Amusement parks in Mexico
Proposed buildings and structures in Mexico